The Canmore Leader was a weekly newspaper based in Canmore, Alberta, Canada. Its final issue was published June 26, 2013.The final editor was Russ Ullyot and the final publisher was Shawn Cornell.  The paper was closed and staff were amalgamated with staff from the Banff Crag & Canyon newspaper to create a regional paper, the Bow Valley Crag & Canyon.

See also
 Pique Newsmagazine
 Similkameen News Leader
 Banff Crag & Canyon

References

External links
 Canmore Leader

Weekly newspapers published in Alberta